Bita Elahian (Alahyan), is an Iranian-American filmmaker and actress, who is currently living in Los Angeles, California. She has studied filmmaking at New York Film Academy (NYFA). Elahian has received various awards for her directing in drama films. She is a member of Women in Film LA and New York Women in Film & Television.

Early life 

Bita Elahian was born in Tehran, where she lived for much of her childhood.

Career 

Bita Elahian began her film career in the Middle East. She gained popularity as both an actress and a theatre director. She directed a performance of Crimes of the Heart. She also directed a rendition called Lobby, which was featured during the Fajr International theatre Festival in Iran.

Later in her career, Elahian decided to transition from theatre to filmmaking. She created a movie entitled The Seventh Day, which was aired in over 20 film festivals.

As she gained recognition as a movie director, Elahian moved to the US to advance her career.  As a student at the New York Film Academy, she directed Beautiful Dream and Blame as part of her coursework. Vida is her latest short film which she directed and acted in.

She was also a member of the selection committee of the Winter Film Awards.

Influence 
Her work focuses on women's empowerment. Currently, the director is a member of New York Women in Film & Television and Women in Film LA.

Filmography 

 Short Films:

Performances

Awards and nominations 

Vida (Short Film)
OFFICIAL SELECTION 
The Valley Film Festival 2019 "Los Angeles" 
Awareness Festival 2019 
KRAF 2019
Indie & Foreign Film Festival 2019 "New York" (WON : The Best Narrative Short Film School Student) 
Goa Short Film Festival 2019 
Fort Myers Beach International Film Festival 2020 
San Diego Film Week 2020 
Sensus Film Festival 2020
Through Women's Eyes International Film Festival 2020 
Los Angeles Women's International Doc Fest 2020 
The Women's Film Festival 2020 
World of Woman Film Fair Middle East 2020
International Migration Film Festival 2020 
Blame (Short Film)
OFFICIAL SELECTION 
Other Venice Film Festival 2017
Los Angeles Movie Awards 2017 (WON : Honorable Mention) 
One Reeler Short Film Competition 2017
(WON : Award of Excellence) 
(WON : The Best Actor) 
The Best Shorts Competition 2017 
(WON : Award of Merit - Women Filmmakers(Student))
(WON : Film Short (Student))
California Women's Film Festival 2018 (WON : 3rd Place Audience Award) 
International Movie Awards 2018 
(WON : GOLD AWARDS - Director)
(WON : PLATINUM AWARDS - International Short Film )
(WON : AWARDS OF MERIT - Editor)
Marina Del Rey Film Festival 2018 
Hollywood Art & Movie Awards 2018  
48 Independent Short Film Festival 2017 
Logcinema Art Films 2018
Utah Film Festival 2018 
Beautiful Dream (Short Film)
OFFICIAL SELECTION 
Spotlight Horror Film Awards 2016 (WON : The Best Drama Short) 
Los Angeles Film Awards 2017 (WON ; Honorable Mention: Indie Film) 
Hollywood Film Competition 2017 (WON : The Best Drama Film)
Women's Only Entertainment Film Festival 2017 (WON : The Best Female Director)
Mindfield Film Festival "Los Angeles" 2017 (WON : Platinum Award - Best Student Short) 
Top Shorts 2017 (WON : Best Student Film) 
Colortape Film Festival, AUS 2017 (WON : Best Short Film) 
Festigious International Film Competition 2017 (WON :Best Drama) 
Short to the Point International Film Festival 2017
Mindfield Film Festival Albuquerque 2017 (WON: Best Short Film) 
Lake View International Film Festival 2017
IMA International Film Festival (India) 2017
Barcelona Planet Film Festival 2017
Aab International Film Festival (AIFF) 2017 
The European Independent Award 2017
Gold Movie Awards Goddess Nike 2018
Festival Silhouette 2018 (WON : Semi-Finalist)

The seventh day (Short Film)
OFFICIAL SELECTION 
Third Eye 14 Asian Film Festival 2015
Kolkata International Film Festival 2015
6th Iran Cinema Celebration 2015
32nd Tehran International short Film Festival 2015
Direct Short and Documentary Film Festival 2015
12th Akbank Short Film Festival 2016
Yari Persian Film Festival 2016
I Filmmaker International Film Festival 2016 "Special Mention"
ُShort to the Point 2017

References

External links 

Living people
American film producers
American film directors
Iranian film producers
Iranian film directors
Iranian film actresses
Actresses from Tehran
American film actresses
Iranian emigrants to the United States
Year of birth missing (living people)
21st-century American women